Scotts Crossing is a neighborhood on the Upper Westside of Atlanta.

It is bordered by:
 Lincoln Homes on the west
 Carver Hills and Carey Park (Atlanta) on the south
 Norfolk Southern Railway line and the Riverside neighborhood on the north

The population is 1,165, more than 90% African American. As of 2009, Scotts Crossing has a lower average household income ($24,947) than the city of Atlanta as a whole ($49,981).

Negro league baseball star James "Red" Moore lived in Scotts Crossing as of February 2011.

References

Neighborhoods in Atlanta